Rafael A. Boasman (Aruba, born 5 June 1953) was Prime Minister of Sint Maarten from 24 November 2017 to 15 January 2018. From 20 December 2016 to 15 January 2018, Boasman was also the Minister of Justice. He was also Minister of Healthcare, Social Development, and Labor from 7 September 2015 to 19 November 2015 and Minister of Tourism, Economic Affairs, Transport and Telecommunications from 20 December 2016 to 4 April 2017.

Boasman became Prime Minister after two motions of no confidence and an instruction by the Dutch Kingdom Council of Ministers to Governor Eugene Holiday to dismiss William Marlin with immediate effect on 24 November 2017.

References

See also
 List of Sint Maarten leaders of government

Prime Ministers of Sint Maarten
Living people
1953 births